KNSN-TV (channel 21) is a primary sports-formatted independent television station in Reno, Nevada, United States, which has a secondary affiliation with MyNetworkTV. It is owned by Deerfield Media, which maintains joint sales and shared services agreements (JSA/SSA) with Sinclair Broadcast Group, owner of Fox affiliate KRXI-TV (channel 11), for the provision of certain services. Sinclair also manages NBC affiliate KRNV-DT (channel 4) under a separate JSA with Cunningham Broadcasting; however, Sinclair effectively owns KRNV as the majority of Cunningham's stock is owned by the family of deceased group founder Julian Smith. The three stations share studios on Vassar Street in Reno; KNSN-TV's transmitter is located on Red Hill between US 395 and SR 445 in Sun Valley, Nevada.

History

The station launched on October 11, 1981, as KAME-TV, an independent station airing movies (TV-21's The Big Movie), cartoons, westerns, and sitcoms. On October 9, 1986, it became a charter Fox affiliate. On January 16, 1995, KAME-TV picked up UPN on a secondary basis; it became a full-time UPN affiliate on January 1, 1996, after KRXI signed-on and took Fox. Between September 1996 and May 1997, the station was briefly owned by Raycom Media. With the 2006 shutdown and merge of The WB and UPN to form The CW, the station joined News Corporation–owned and Fox sister network MyNetworkTV on September 5, 2006.

On July 20, 2012, one day after Cox Media Group purchased WAWS and WTEV in Jacksonville, Florida, and KOKI-TV and KMYT-TV in Tulsa, Oklahoma, from Newport Television, Cox put KRXI-TV (along with the LMA for KAME-TV) and sister stations WTOV-TV in Steubenville, Ohio, WJAC-TV in Johnstown, Pennsylvania, and KFOX-TV in El Paso, Texas (all in markets that are smaller than Tulsa), plus several radio stations in medium to small markets, on the selling block. On February 25, 2013, Cox announced that it would sell the four television stations, and the LMA for KAME, to Sinclair Broadcast Group; as part of the deal, Ellis Communications would sell KAME-TV to Deerfield Media. The Federal Communications Commission (FCC) granted its approval on April 30, 2013, one day after it approved the sale of sister station, KRXI. The sale was finalized on May 2, 2013. Sinclair would subsequently purchase the non-license assets of a third Reno station, KRNV-DT, on November 22, 2013. Sinclair could not buy KRNV-DT outright because Reno has only six full-power stations—three too few to legally permit a duopoly. With the sale of KRNV's license to Cunningham, Sinclair now controls half of those stations. The sale also created a situation in which a Fox affiliate is the nominal senior partner in a duopoly involving an NBC affiliate and a "Big Three" station.

On August 31, 2018, Sinclair announced that KAME-TV would relaunch as "Nevada Sports Net," which would feature extended coverage of Nevada Wolf Pack athletics, as well as the Reno Aces and the Mountain West Conference. The station would continue to air MyNetworkTV on a secondary basis. The new format launched on September 1. At that time, NSN took over KRNV's sports department. On July 15, 2019, the station's call sign was changed to KNSN-TV.

Programming
Before the station shifted to a mainly sports-themed format, syndicated programming featured on KAME-TV included The Real (later aired on KRXI-TV), Judge Faith, The Simpsons, Family Guy (now airing on KOLO-DT3), and Anger Management, among others.

Technical information

Subchannels
The station's digital signal is multiplexed:

Translators

Analog-to-digital conversion
KNSN-TV (as KAME-TV) shut down its analog signal, over UHF channel 21, on February 17, 2009, the original target date in which full-power television stations in the United States were to transition from analog to digital broadcasts under federal mandate (which was later pushed back to June 12, 2009). The station's digital signal remained on its pre-transition UHF channel 20. Through the use of PSIP, digital television receivers display the station's virtual channel as its former UHF analog channel 21.

References

External links
 

MyNetworkTV affiliates
Stadium (sports network) affiliates
Comet (TV network) affiliates
Sinclair Broadcast Group
Television channels and stations established in 1981
1981 establishments in Nevada
NSN-TV